Spaces is an album by jazz guitarist Larry Coryell that was released in 1970 by Vanguard Records. Coryell is accompanied by John McLaughlin on guitar, Chick Corea on electric piano, Miroslav Vitouš on bass, and Billy Cobham on drums. The album was produced by Daniel Weiss and engineered by David Baker and Paul Berkowitz.

The album is sometimes considered to have started the jazz fusion genre.

The Sessions

The first day was strange’, said Larry, of the sessions. “because Chick and Billy and John had just come from…sessions with Miles. They had definitely been taking some different approaches to the music at that session, because when I threw down the first piece, “Tyrone” by Larry Young, the cats did not play it straight. They were all going into outer space…Almost nothing we played that first day made the cut: it seems as if we got most of the music that went on the record on the second day. It just took a while to get comfortable with each other and the material…Spaces did not do that great upon initial release, but when  Vanguard reissued it a few years later, it sold 250,000 copies. Not bad for a record that sounded very little like traditional jazz and nothing like rock.’

Two discarded tracks from the two-day Spaces sessions, ‘Tyrone’ and ‘Planet End’ were released on Planet End in 1975, along with contemporary material by Coryell's then-current band The Eleventh House. (From the book Bathed In Lightning by Colin Harper _ Jawbone Press 2014)

Track listing

Personnel
 Larry Coryell – guitar
 John McLaughlin – guitar (1,2,4,5)
 Chick Corea – electric piano (5)
 Miroslav Vitouš – double bass (1,3,4,5)
 Billy Cobham – drums (1,3,4,5)

Production
 Dave Baker – engineer, mixing
 Paul Berkowitz – assistant
 Daniel Weiss – producer

References

1970 albums
Larry Coryell albums
Vanguard Records albums